Team Durham (formerly Durham University Athletic Union, DUAU) is a student-run organisation responsible for sport at Durham University. Durham University's sports programme, run by Team Durham, has produced more professional sports people than any other UK university (141 as of 2022) and has twice seen Durham named Times and  Sunday Times Sports University of the Year (2015 and 2023). It has ranked in the top three institutions in British Universities and Colleges Sport (BUCS) every season since 2011–12.

Team Durham played first class cricket as Durham University Centre of Cricketing Excellence and Durham MCC University from 2001 to 2020. The rugby club plays in BUCS Super Rugby, BUCS's flagship competition and the highest level student rugby in the UK, and were league winners in 2019–20 and 2021–22. Team Durham compete as the Durham Palatinates in the top-level Women's British Basketball League.

Team Durham awards the Palatinate, an equivalent of the University Sporting Blue. Famous recipients of a Full Palatinate include cricketer Nasser Hussain, triple jumper Jonathan Edwards and rugby player Phil de Glanville.

Team Durham instituted a policy in 2016 allowing students to train and (if permitted by the national governing body) compete in the team that best fitted their gender identity. This was proposed to the National Union of Students as a model for a national policy.

History

Administrative history

The Durham Colleges Athletic Union was formed by the captains of the men's sports teams in the Durham division of Durham University in 1927, prior to which sports were run directly by the university. A federal Durham University Athletic Union was formed in 1929 with representatives from the Durham Colleges Athletic Union, from the Armstrong College and College of Medicine athletic unions in the Newcastle division of the university, and from the men's and women's university teams. From 1931 it was affiliated as a full member to the Universities Athletic Union (now British Universities and Colleges Sport; BUCS).

In 1946, the Durham Colleges Athletic Union merged with the Durham Colleges Women's Athletic Union, which had been formed in 1938. It became the Durham University Athletic Union in 1963, when the Newcastle division of the university became the independent Newcastle University. In 2002, Gabby Logan launched Durham University's "Team Durham" initiative to provide coaching and facilities for talented athletes. The athletics union was re-branded as Team Durham in 2006.

As a consequence of the Charities Act 2006, which removed exempt charitable status from students' unions, Team Durham was, along with a number of other student associations and some junior common rooms, legally incorporated into the university as a Durham Student Organisation in 2011.

Sporting history

Sport at Durham University dates back to the university's foundation, with boats having raced in the first Durham Regatta in 1834, at the end the first academic year. The first recorded university cricket match was in 1842.

After the formation of the athletics unions and joining the Universities Athletics Union, Durham's first national titles came in men's cricket, with victories in 1938 and 39. These were the only victories until after the Second World War, when victories came in women's netball in 1949, 50 and 51, men's tennis in 1949, men's rugby union in 1951 and 55, mixed rifles in 1951, men's fencing in 1952, 53, 59 and 60, men's golf in 1953, men's association football in 1956, men's badminton in 1957 and 59, men's table tennis in 1957, 58 and 59, women's fencing in 1959 and 62, and women's tennis in 1960, before the separation of the Newcastle division in 1963.

In recent years, Team Durham was ranked second (behind Loughborough) in the BUCS overall championship in 2012, 2013, 2014, 2015, 2016, 2017 and 2018. They came third (behind Loughborough and Nottingham) in 2019 and 2022 (the 2019–20 season was incomplete, and the 2020–21 season did not happen, due to COVID). Durham were ranked top in BUCS for team sports in 2014-15, when they also became only the second team (after Loughborough) to gain over 4000 BUCS points. Both of these achievements were repeated in 2015-16. In 2016-17, Durham had 30 top tier BUCS teams, three more than closest rivals Loughborough, and had a total of 119 teams entered in BUCS competitions, the most of any UK university.

Durham University Boat Club held the BUCS rowing Victor Ludorum for ten years consecutively from 2004 until 2013 and regained it in 2015.

In 2022, Team Durham won BUCS national championships in women's cricket, men's rugby, men's fencing, women's futsal, men's lacrosse, women's rowing and women's volleyball.

BUCS/BUSA record

The Universities Athletics Union was formed from the Inter-Varsity Athletics Board in 1930. British Universities Sports Association (BUSA) was formed in 1994 by the merger of the Universities Athletics Union (UAU; formed 1919), the British Universities Sports Federation, the British Students Sports Federation, the British Polytechnics Sports Association and the British Colleges Sports Association. In 2008, BUSA merged with University College Sport to form BUCS. Durham participated in UAU competitions from 1931 to 1994, in BUSA from 1994 to 2008, and in BUCS from 2008 onwards.

Facilities

Maiden Castle

Team Durham is based at the Maiden Castle sports centre, with a large , a smaller  hall, an indoor cricket centre, fencing salle and other facilities, along with three 3G pitches (used for association football, American football and lacrosse), two water-based hockey pitches, and a variety of grass pitches, including baseball/softball and cricket. The centre was upgraded at a cost of £35 million between 2017 and 2020. The football ground, which lies inside a running track and has a 300-seat grandstand and turnstile-controlled access, has been used since this upgrade as the home ground of Durham W.F.C. in the FA Women's Championship.

The Racecourse

There is a first class cricket ground at the Racecourse, along with other grass pitches and Green Lane Cricket Ground (Durham City Cricket Club), used for some inter-college games and non-first team BUCS matches. The Rugby fives club has two fives courts in the Racecourse pavilion.

Hollow Drift
The rugby club shares a ground with Durham City RFC at Hollow Drift, and the university has further grass pitches adjacent to this at Whinney Hill, used for inter-collegiate rounders and ultimate frisbee. Hollow Drift, which is owned by the university, has been earmarked for further development of its sporting facilities in the university's 2017–2027 estates masterplan. The ground has seen crowds of over 6,000 for the rugby club's annual charity matches against other top BUCS rugby teams. The Original All Blacks played at Hollow Drift in 1905, beating Durham County, the English county champions, 16–3 in front of a crowd of 8,000.

Elsewhere
The waterpolo team uses the pool at Durham County Council's Freeman's Quay Leisure Centre. In addition to courts at Maiden Castle, the tennis club uses the David Lloyd centre in Sunderland and the Durham Archery Lawn Tennis Club. The  university boat club has a boat house on the River Tyne in Gateshead, shared with Tyne United Rowing Club, as well as at Maiden Castle, and many college clubs have boathouses along the River Wear in Durham. The sailing club uses Derwent Water reservoir, where they have a fleet of firefly dinghies, as their training ground.

Inter-college sport

Team Durham runs a large intramural sports programme based around the colleges of Durham University, with three quarters of students participating. 550 college teams compete across eighteen sports: badminton, basketball, cheerleading, cricket (indoor and outdoor), football, hockey, futsal, lacrosse, netball, pool, rounders, rowing, rugby union (full-contact and touch), squash, table tennis, tennis, ultimate frisbee and volleyball.

Varsity matches

BUCS Varsity
Durham competes in the BUCS Varsity against Loughborough University, which has been organised twice-yearly (home and away) as part of the BUCS fixture list since 2015.

College varsities

Team Durham's best college teams participate in two annual college varsity competitions against their counterparts from colleges of the University of York and against teams from Loughborough Sport's intra-mural sports competition.

Boat Race of the North

Team Durham rowers compete against Newcastle University in multiple categories in the annual Boat Race of the North competition.

Student performance programmes

Team Durham has student performance programmes covering 17 sports. It has recognised national centres of excellence in a number of sports, including the Durham MCC University cricket programme (funded by the England and Wales Cricket Board), British Rowing Performance Centre status, and Lawn Tennis Association University Partner status. 

There are 25 Vice Chancellor's scholarships available annually for undergraduates across sports, arts and music (normally 8–10 awards in sports), 20 Palatinate scholarships for students who just missed out on a Vice Chancellor's Scholarship in sports, and 3 Weldon-le Huray scholarships in sports for students from low-income backgrounds. In addition, there are over 100 sports scholarships for postgraduate students. Durham is also one of the "delivery sites" for Sport England's Talented Athlete Scholarship Scheme.

Partnerships

Team Durham has partnerships with Durham W.F.C. (women's football), Durham United F.C. (men's football) and DMP Sharks (women's rugby).

University clubs

Team Durham has 56 clubs representing the university across 53 sports, many of which compete in BUCS but including others in non-BUCS sports. Some of the more notable university clubs are:

 Durham University Boat Club 
 Durham University Cricket Club 
 Durham University Hockey Club
 Durham University Men's Lacrosse Club
 Durham University Rugby Football Club
 Durham University Swimming Club

Team Durham teams competing in non-student leagues include:
 Durham Wildcats – Women's British Basketball League
 Durham University Hockey Club – Women's England Hockey League Division One North and Men's England Hockey League Division One North
 Durham University Athletic Football Club (through a partnership with Durham United Football Club) – Wearside Football League Division One

Charity events
The Athletic Union hosts 3 charity events per year, the Rugby Charity Challenge, Durham Fun Run and Twenty:20 Charity cricket. These events raise money for Sport Action in Zambia, Team Durham's official charity.

References

External links
TeamDurham.com

Clubs and societies of Durham University
Sport in Durham, England